A roller docker, rolling docker, dough docker, roto-fork, or simply docker is a food preparation utensil which resembles either a small, spiked rolling pin, or a small rotary tiller. It is used to pierce bread dough, cracker dough, pizza dough or pastry dough to prevent over rising or blistering.
This specialized tool is more commonly found in professional bakeries than in homes that only do light or occasional baking.

Roller dockers come in a variety of materials, including nylon, plastic, and steel.

See also
Baking
Peel (tool)
Proofing (baking technique)

References

Food preparation utensils